Marine Fighting Squadron 236 (VMF-236) was a fighter squadron in the United States Marine Corps. The squadron, also known as the “Black Panthers”, was part of the Marine Forces Reserve for a short time following World War II and were based at Naval Air Station Denver, Colorado until their disestablishment. Originally established during World War II, they fought in the Pacific War most notably during the Bougainville Campaign and the campaign to liberate the Philippines.  The squadron conducted the first dive bombing attack against Bougainville and was credited with downing 4 Japanese aircraft during the course of the war.  VMSB-236 was disestablished on August 1, 1945 at Mindanao, Philippines two weeks before the surrender of Japan  They were reactivated as part of the Reserves but were again deactivated in the late 1960s and remain in an inactive status today.

History

World War II
The squadron was formed on 1 January 1943 at Marine Corps Air Station Mojave, California as Marine Scout Bombing Squadron 236 (VMSB-236) flying the SBD Dauntless. In April 1943 they moved to Marine Corps Air Station Ewa, Hawaii for follow on training and eventually joined the war landing at Guadalcanal on 4 September 1943. From there the squadron took part in the first dive bombing strikes against Bougainville in preparation for the allied landing there on 1 November 1943. During the next year and a half the squadron would move frequently with its ground and air echelons being based in such places as Munda in the Solomon Islands, Torokina on Bougainville, Green Island in Papua New Guinea and Efate in what was then New Hebrides.

In January 1945 the squadron moved to Luzon in the Philippines and became part of Marine Aircraft Group 24 (MAG-24) at an airfield in Mangaldan near Lingayen Gulf.  Later on they moved to Moret Field on Mindanao.  The squadron stayed in the Philippines for the remainder of the war flying close air support missions in support of the Sixth United States Army and Eighth United States Army. VMSB-236 was decommissioned on 1 August 1945 at Mindanao, Philippines two weeks before the surrender of Japan.

Reserve years
VMF-236 was reactivated on February 28, 1947 at Naval Air Station Denver as part of the Marine Air Reserve Training Command.

See also

 United States Marine Corps Aviation
 List of active United States Marine Corps aircraft squadrons
 List of decommissioned United States Marine Corps aircraft squadrons

Notes

References

Bibliography

 Tillman, Barrett. SBD Dauntless Units of World War 2. Botley, Oxford: Osprey Publishing, 1998. .

Web

Fighting236
1943 establishments in California
Inactive units of the United States Marine Corps
Military units and formations established in 1943